Radio Gotham is the debut album by Italian singer-songwriter Rose Villain, released on 20 January 2023. The project was anticipated by the singles Elvis, Michelle Pfeiffer and Rari released bewtween 2021 and 2022, while on January 10, 2023 Villain released the promotional single Lamette featuring Salmo.

Track listing

Charts

References 

2023 debut albums
Italian-language albums
Sony Music Italy albums